The Kerala rat or Ranjini’s field rat, (Rattus ranjiniae) is a species of rodent in the family Muridae found only in Kerala, India. In Kerala, it is known only from fragmented locations in Alappuzha, Thrissur, and Thiruvananthapuram. Its natural habitats are subtropical or tropical dry lowland grassland and swamps.

References

Further reading

Rattus
Rats of Asia
Rodents of India
Endangered fauna of Asia
Mammals described in 1969
Taxonomy articles created by Polbot